Amzajerd (also Romanized as Amzājerd and Amzājard) is a village in Hegmataneh Rural District, in the Central District of Hamadan County, Hamadan Province, Iran. At the 2006 census, its population was 2,916, in 749 families.

References 

Populated places in Hamadan County